Sturgeon High School is a public secondary school in Sturgeon, Missouri. It is operated by the Sturgeon R-V School District and serves a small part of north central Boone County, Missouri. It borders the Centralia and Harrisburg Public School Districts.

References

External links
Official site

Sturgeon, Missouri
Public high schools in Missouri
High schools in Boone County, Missouri